Rypobiini is a tribe of minute hooded beetles in the family Corylophidae. There are at least 2 genera and about 14 described species in Rypobiini.

Genera
These two genera belong to the tribe Rypobiini:
 Gloeosoma Wollaston, 1854
 Rypobius LeConte, 1852

References

Further reading

 
 
 

Corylophidae
Articles created by Qbugbot